Late Night Tales Presents After Dark is a DJ mix album by Bill Brewster for Late Night Tales series, released by Night Time Stories on 5 May 2013. The album is the first edition of After Dark spinoff series. It diverges from Late Night Tales''' usual format of loosely themed and artist-curated mixes and is more of a DJ-led club-oriented mix which includes 70's disco and funk and contemporary house. It features songs and remixes from I:Cube, Jamiroquai, Padded Cell, Zed Bias, François Kevorkian along with some unreleased cuts.

Brewster described After Dark as "dance music for people who know how to make love" while The Vinyl Factory’s Anton Spice called Brewster "a musical polymath” and wrote that “it’s clear the After Dark series was practically invented around Brewster’s bag of nocturnal downtempo electronica."

Track listing
 “Love the Way You Love Me” - Marti Caine
 “The Love” (Exclusive Mix) - Linus Loves
 “Quiller” (Fat Camp Edit/Previously Unreleased) - Quiller
 “All Around and Away We Go” (Hotel Motel Mix/Previously Unreleased) - Mr Twin Sister
 “Extraterrestrial Manoeuvres in the Dark” - Tigersushi Bass System 
 “Alright” (DJ Excursion Unreleased Version) - Jamiroquai
 “Compulsion” (Padded Cell Remix/Previously Unreleased) - Doves
 “University Band Moon Plain“ (Exclusive Track) - Coober Pedy
 “Movin’ In“ (Brennan Green Mix) - Jamie Lloyd
 “Best Is Yet to Come” - Fernando Pulichino 
 “Keep on Pokin’” - Martin Kershaw
 “Machistador“ (Fat Camp Edit/Previously Unreleased) - Matthieu Chedid
 “Beach Towel“ (I:Cube Mix) - Karma
 “Koolade” - Zed Bias
 “The Go Go” - Beans & Company 
 “After Dark” (Exclusive Track) - Tad Wily
 “Blow Your Body” (François K Deep Space Dub) - Herbest Moon
 “Space Talk” - Asha Puthli

See also
 Late Night Tales Presents After Dark: Nightshift Late Night Tales Presents After Dark: NocturneReferences

External links
 After Dark'' at Late Night Tales

After Dark
2013 compilation albums